13 Stories (A Prelude) is a studio album by Canadian hip hop producer Factor. It was released on Side Road Records in 2010.

Critical reception
Writing for Potholes in My Blog, Zach Cole gave the album 3 stars out of 5, saying, "13 Stories is interesting in that the productions are more rooted in traditional hip-hop, and they are certainly not Factor's most abstract by any means, yet the album remains challenging – in a good way."

Track listing

References

External links
 

2010 albums
Alternative hip hop albums by Canadian artists
Factor (producer) albums